Red Room Sessions may refer to:

The Red Room Sessions, by Shakespears Sister
Red Room Sessions (Busted EP)
Red Room Sessions (Kym Marsh EP)